Edward Auriol Hay-Drummond (10 April 1758, Westminster –30 December 1829), the fifth son of Robert Hay Drummond (1711–76, Archbishop of York) and his wife, Henrietta née Auriol (died 1773), who were married on 31 January 1748.

Personal life
He was baptised in St. Margaret's, Westminster. He was educated at Christ Church, Oxford (1774, BA 1777, MA 1780, B&DD 1791).

On 12 December 1782 he married Elizabeth Vismes (d. 14 February 1790), daughter of William, Comte de Vismes, and she bore him a daughter,  Henrietta Auriol Hay-Drummond (d. 1832), who was married in 1831 to Morgan Watkins; and a son, Edward William Auriol Drummond-Hay (1785-1845), who was married 14 December 1812 to Louisa Margaret Thomson (d. 1869).

On 24 May 1791 Edward Hay-Drummond was married again, to Amelia Emily Auriol in St George's, Hanover Square.  She was born in 1762 and died on 7 October 1840, in Southwold, Suffolk.  She bore him a daughter, Amelia Auriol Hay-Drummond, on 11 September 1794, in Little Missenden — the daughter later eloped with his curate, George Wilkins, to Gretna Green, where they were married on 2 September 1811, ten days before her 17th birthday.  The couple then returned to live in the parental home in Hadleigh, and went on to have fifteen children, a granddaughter of one of whom was Olave St. Clair Soames, who became World Chief Guide. His second wife died on 31 January 1871 in Bayswater.

Works
Two of his works are still available today:-
"On the religious education of the poor"; a sermon, preached at the Church of St. Botolph, Bishopsgate, London, 25 May 1800, before the Correspondent Board in London of the Society in Scotland
"A steady attachment to the Christian faith. Peculiar duty of its established ministers." Preached in the parish church of Alnwick, in Northumberland, 8 August 1792.

He is believed to have fathered a total of ten children, including the two mentioned above, and Henrietta and Charlotte.

Career
Prebendary of York 1784
Chaplain in Ordinary to George III 1789, and to William IV. 
Prebendary of Southwell 1789
Rector of Rothbury, Northumberland
Rector of Hadleigh, Suffolk, for 33 years through an exchange with Dr Watson 1796–1829
Prebendary of Southwell Minster 1806
Rector of Dalham, Suffolk 1822
Dean of Bocking, Essex

He was "of the Parish of St Margaret's, Westminster" at the time of his second marriage.

He died on 30 December 1829 in Hadleigh and was buried at Hadleigh within the altar rails on 9 January 1830. There is a mural monument on the south wall of the Lady Chapel at Hadleigh.

References

1758 births
1829 deaths
18th-century English Anglican priests
19th-century English Anglican priests
Alumni of Christ Church, Oxford
Deans of Bocking
18th-century Anglican priests
19th-century Anglican priests